Sahibnagar is a town located in the Punjab province of Pakistan. It is located in Lahore District at 31°21'0N 73°4'0E with an altitude of 167 metres (551 feet) and lies near to the city of Lahore. Neighbouring settlements include Hari Singwala to the west and Rodasar to the south.

References

Populated places in Lahore District